Time for Sunday School was a Canadian children's religious television series which aired on CBC Television from 1962 to 1966.

Premise
The series consisted of Bible stories and music with episodes of the US animated series Davey and Goliath. The series also featured Canadian-produced Crabapple Island segments whose leading characters were Mayor Basil Bullfrog and Myopia Mole.

By late 1964, the series featured elements of comparative religion, for example featuring the subject of Hallowe'en and the historic contributions of Druids to that festival.

Series hosts included Gloria Chetwynd, Ann Graham and Helene Nickerson. Nickerson left the series after June 1963 to pursue a teaching career.

Production
The series was produced at CBC Montreal by Robert Haylock, and later Bill Rice.

Scheduling
This half-hour series aired on Sunday mornings or early afternoons for four seasons, except during mid-year breaks (July to October). Its debut was 7 October 1962 and its last broadcast was on 26 June 1966.

References

External links
 

CBC Television original programming
1962 Canadian television series debuts
1966 Canadian television series endings
1960s Canadian children's television series
Television series about Christianity